Robert Marušič (born 10 August 1973) is a retired Slovenian football defender.

References

1973 births
Living people
Slovenian footballers
ND Gorica players
NK Primorje players
Maccabi Herzliya F.C. players
FC Viktoria Plzeň players
Association football defenders
Czech First League players
Israeli Premier League players
Slovenian expatriate footballers
Expatriate footballers in Israel
Expatriate footballers in the Czech Republic
Slovenian expatriate sportspeople in Israel
Slovenian expatriate sportspeople in the Czech Republic